North Macedonia competed at the 2022 Winter Olympics in Beijing, China, from 4 to 20 February 2022.

The North Macedonia team consisted of three athletes (two men and one woman) competing in two sports. Dardan Dehari was the country's flagbearer during the opening ceremony. Meanwhile a volunteer was the flagbearer during the closing ceremony.

Competitors
The following is the list of number of competitors participating at the Games per sport/discipline.

Alpine skiing

By meeting the basic qualification standards, North Macedonia has qualified one male alpine skier.

Cross-country skiing

By meeting the basic qualification standards, North Macedonia has qualified one male and one female cross-country skier.

Distance

Sprint

References

Nations at the 2022 Winter Olympics
2022
Winter Olympics